Discovery Familia is an American Spanish-language family-oriented specialty television channel owned by Warner Bros. Discovery. The network launched on August 9, 2007.

The channel airs preschool-intended programming, programming for kids from 6 a.m to 11 a.m and family-oriented adult programming from 10 a.m to 8 p.m ET/PT.

As of February 2015, approximately 5.8 million American households (or 5% of households with television) receive Discovery Familia.

See also
 Discovery Kids (Latin America)
 Discovery Home & Health

References

External links
 

Children's television networks in the United States
Television channels and stations established in 2007
Warner Bros. Discovery networks
Spanish-language television networks in the United States
Preschool education television networks